The All-Ireland Senior Hurling Championship quarter-finals are played to determine which teams will contest the All-Ireland Senior Hurling Championship semi-finals. They are the third last phase of the All-Ireland Senior Hurling Championship, a hurling competition contested by the top inter-county teams in Ireland. The quarter-finals are usually contested at Semple Stadium, Thurles, however, some quarter-finals have been played at alternative venues.

List of quarter-finals by decade

Quarter-final key

1900s

1910s

1940s

1970s

1980s

1990s

2000s

2010s

2020s

See also
 List of All-Ireland Senior Hurling Championship finals
 List of All-Ireland Senior Hurling Championship semi-finals

Quarterfinals
Quarterfinals